The Fast Light Window Manager is a stacking window manager written in C++ and available for redistribution under the terms of the GNU General Public Licence. FLWM is the default window manager for Tiny Core Linux.

Features 

Features of the FLWM window manager include:
 Small (i386: 43.6 kB package, 156.0 kB installed, ia64: 58.1 kB package, 216.0 kB installed)
 Stacking windows
 Written in C++
 Freely redistributable under the terms of the GPL-2.0-or-later license
 Based on the FLTK toolkit
 Window decorations include borders and a vertical titlebar
 sloppy focus with click to focus (no autoraise)
 Multiple desktops
 Desktop switching via menu or through keyboard navigation
 No support for themes. Colors are customizable via command line arguments.

See also 

 Comparison of X window managers

References

External links 
 

Free X window managers
Software that uses FLTK
Articles containing video clips